Colin McKenzie (born May 4, 1964) is a Canadian former rugby union player who played as number eight.

Career
At club level, McKenzie played for the UBC Old Boys Ravens. He debuted for Canada on 13 June 1992, against United States in Denver. He was also called up in the Canada team for the 1995 Rugby World Cup, playing 2 matches in the tournament. His last cap for Canada was against Ireland, at Lansdowne Road, on 30 November 1997.

References

External links

1964 births
Living people
Sportspeople from Vancouver
Canadian rugby union players
Canada international rugby union players
University of British Columbia alumni
Rugby union number eights